The 1964–65 Hong Kong First Division League season was the 54th since its establishment.

League table

References
1964–65 Hong Kong First Division table (RSSSF)

Hong Kong First Division League seasons
Hong
football